Verneri Välimaa (born 19 January 1993) is a Finnish-American professional soccer player who last played as a midfielder for DSV Leoben.

Career

College and Youth
Välimaa was born in Helsinki, Finland, and moved to Coral Springs, Florida at the age of five. In 2010, Välimaa helped Delray Beach American Heritage School to Florida's Class 2A State Championship by scoring 32 goals and distributing 18 assists. In 2011, Välimaa was named Gatorade Florida Boys Soccer Player of the Year 2010-2011, the Sun-Sentinel Player of the Year and an ESPN Rise All-American.

Välimaa began his collegiate career at George Mason University, starting all 18 games for the Patriots and tallying 2 goals and 9 assists. For his sophomore, junior and senior seasons, Välimaa played for the University of North Carolina. He appeared in 56 games for the Tar Heels and was awarded Atlantic Coast Conference Academic honors in his sophomore and junior years.

Tampa Bay Rowdies
On 30 March 2015 it was announced that Välimaa had signed his first professional contract with the Tampa Bay Rowdies of the North American Soccer League. Välimaa initially joined the Rowdies as a trialist on 18 March, seeing time against the University of Tampa. He also played against the USF Bulls -  where he made an impact by playing in a dangerous cross that led to a USF own goal - and in the preseason finale against Jacksonville Armada FC.

Välimaa's first regular season minutes as a professional footballer came during the Rowdies' April 11 home opener vs. Minnesota United FC. He came on as a substitute in the 76th minute for team captain Marcelo Saragosa.

Orange County Blues FC
On 24 March 2016, the Rowdies announced they were sending Välimaa to the USL's Orange County Blues FC on a season-long loan.

Colorado Springs Switchbacks FC
On 25 January 2018, Välimaa joined the Colorado Springs Switchbacks FC of the United Soccer League.

References

External links 
 Tampa Bay Rowdies Profile
 North Carolina Tar Heels Profile
 George Mason Patriots Profile
 Verneri Välimaa on Twitter

1993 births
Living people
American soccer players
Finnish footballers
North Carolina Tar Heels men's soccer players
George Mason Patriots men's soccer players
Ocala Stampede players
Floridians FC players
Tampa Bay Rowdies players
Association football midfielders
Soccer players from Florida
USL League Two players
North American Soccer League players
Orange County SC players
USL Championship players
Weston FC players
Colorado Springs Switchbacks FC players
Expatriate footballers in Austria
DSV Leoben players
American people of Finnish descent
Sportspeople from Coral Springs, Florida
JJK Jyväskylä players
United States men's youth international soccer players